Walter Anselm Henry Kahn MBE (24 May 1926 – 15 March 2015) was a key figure in the development of gliding in Britain after the Second World War.

Kahn attended Highgate School from 1938 until 1943, a classmate of Gerard Hoffnung, and joined the Royal Air Force the following year. He was on the council of the British Gliding Association for almost 50 years.

Bio 
Walter Anselm Henry Kahn was born on 24 May 1926 in Mannheim to German parents of Azerbaijani Jewish ancestry. The family moved to Finchley and Kahn was educated at Highgate School. He joined the RAF to fly in February 1944 but the need for aircrew had diminished; he became a clerk and then worked in bomb disposal.

Awards
Fédération Aéronautique International Gold Award with three Diamonds.
Royal Aero Club's Silver Medal. (1995)
British Gliding Association Gold Medal. (2014)
Royal Air Force Air Efficiency Award
MBE. (2011)

Selected publications

References

1926 births
2015 deaths
Glider pilots
Jewish emigrants from Nazi Germany to the United Kingdom
People educated at Highgate School
Royal Air Force personnel of World War II
Members of the Order of the British Empire